A pocket computer was a 1980s-era user programmable calculator-sized computer that had fewer screen lines,
 and often fewer characters per line, than the Pocket-sized computers introduced beginning in 1989. Manufacturers included Casio, Hewlett-Packard, Sharp, Tandy/Radio Shack (selling Casio and Sharp models under their own TRS line) and many more. The last Sharp pocket computer, the PC-G850V (2001) is programmable in C, BASIC, and Assembler. An important feature of pocket computers was that all programming languages were available for the device itself, not downloaded from a cross-compiler on a larger computer.

The programming language was usually BASIC.

See also 
 Formula calculator
 Mobile device
 Programmable calculator
 Smartbook

References

External links 

 Pocket Computer Museum
 Soviet Calculators Collection (English)
 www.calculators.de – Museum of Pocket Calculating Devices
 List of pocket computers manufacturers
 http://www.angelfire.com/planet/geraldk/Gdkpc4.htm
 http://oldcomputers.net/